Tuija Kaarina Brax (née Karvonen; born 6 January 1965 in Helsinki) is a Finnish politician and former Minister of Justice. She is a Member of Finnish Parliament, representing the Green League. She was first elected to the Parliament in 1995. She has been the Minister of Justice in Matti Vanhanen's second cabinet and Mari Kiviniemi's cabinet.

She has also been a member of the Helsinki City Council from 1993 and she is active in various professional sport organizations.

Brax has a Master's degree in law from the University of Helsinki. Brax has also served as the Chair of the Legal Affairs Committee in the Finnish Parliament. She is married to Antti Brax. They have two children, Aarni (born 1993) and Arttu (born 1997).

References

External links

 Official Website of Tuija Brax 

1965 births
Living people
Politicians from Helsinki
Finnish Lutherans
Green League politicians
Ministers of Justice of Finland
Members of the Parliament of Finland (1995–99)
Members of the Parliament of Finland (1999–2003)
Members of the Parliament of Finland (2003–07)
Members of the Parliament of Finland (2007–11)
Members of the Parliament of Finland (2011–15)
Women government ministers of Finland
21st-century Finnish women politicians
Female justice ministers
Women members of the Parliament of Finland
University of Helsinki alumni